Conopomorpha cyanospila is a moth of the family Gracillariidae. It is known from New Zealand.

The larvae feed on Alectryon excelsus. They feed on the fruit of their host plant. They enter the young fruit through circular holes drilled in the capsule and seed walls. They then tunnel into the contents and kill the seeds.

References

Conopomorpha
Moths of New Zealand
Moths described in 1886